This is a list of the municipalities in the province of Salamanca in the autonomous community of Castile and León, Spain. There are 362 municipalities in the province.

See also

Geography of Spain
List of cities in Spain
Kingdom of León
Leonese language

External links
www.fregeneda.com Web "La Fregeneda"
Yecla de Yeltes Web and Online Community
Instituto Nacional de Estadística (Spain)  Official site web for more information

 
Salamanca